Pyhäranta is a Finnish  that was commissioned in 1992. The ship underwent an extensive mid-life refit in 2017, but ran aground and damaged its hull during an exercise in August 2022.

History 
The Finnish Navy placed an order for Pyhäranta from the Olkiluoto shipyard in May 1990. The ship was commissioned on 26 April 1992.

In May 2015, Atlas Elektronik Finland received a contract to perform a mid-life refit of all three Pansio-class minelayers. Pyhäranta was updated at the Uki Workboat shipyard, receiving new systems and minelaying equipment, as well as maintenance of all old systems. It was the last of the three ships in the refit to be completed, and was handed over to the navy in December 2017.

Grounding 
On 24 August 2022, Pyhäranta was participating in live fire exercises with the Coastal Fleet, towing a floating target device behind. While retrieving the device, the ship ran aground off the island Örö. The grounding led to minor damage of the ship's bow, as well as some flooding in the front of the ship. However, the crew was able to contain the damage, and no oil or other environmental contaminants were leaked. The crew was moved to another ship for safety reasons, and the ship was inspected by navy divers in preparation for freeing it from the seabed. Additionally, the Border Guard oil spill response vessel Halli and offshore patrol craft  were dispatched to monitor the ship for any environmental risks.

References 

Minelayers of the Finnish Navy
Maritime incidents in 2022